Pennsylvania's 24th congressional district was one of Pennsylvania's districts of the United States House of Representatives.

History

This district was created in 1833. It was eliminated as a result of the redistricting cycle after the 1980 Census.

List of representatives

References

 
 
 Congressional Biographical Directory of the United States 1774–present

23
Former congressional districts of the United States
1833 establishments in Pennsylvania
Constituencies established in 1833
Constituencies disestablished in 1983
1983 disestablishments in Pennsylvania